Old Dock was the world's first commercial wet dock, built on the River Mersey in Liverpool, England.

Old Dock may also refer to:
Old Dock, Garston,a maritime dock in the Port of Garston on the River Mersey at Garston, Liverpool, England
Old Dock, Grimsby, later expanded to form the Alexandra Dock
Old Dock, Kingston upon Hull, a former dock in Kingston upon Hull in the East Riding of Yorkshire, England